The term Diet of Mainz may refer to any medieval Hoftag (high day) or early modern Reichstag (imperial diet) held in the city of Mainz. The following is an incomplete list of such diets by year and emperor:

1098, Henry IV
1119, Henry V
1184, Frederick I
1188, Frederick I
1235, Frederick II
1439, Frederick III
1441, Frederick III

Mainz
History of Mainz